Osmunda vancouverensis is an extinct species of Osmunda ferns.  The name is used to refer to permineralized fertile frond segments found in the Lower Cretaceous of British Columbia (specifically, Vancouver Island).

References

Osmundales
Ferns of the Americas
Cretaceous plants